Michael O'Grady (born 11 October 1942) is an English former professional footballer born in Leeds, who played two games for the England national team, scoring three goals.

He also played club football in the Football League for Huddersfield Town, Leeds United, Wolverhampton Wanderers, Birmingham City and Rotherham United, and made one appearance in November 1974 for Cork Hibernians.

During his time at Leeds he played in the second leg of the 1968 Inter-Cities Fairs Cup Final as they defeated Ferencváros on aggregate, and also made 38 appearances (and scored 8 goals) as they won the First Division in 1968–69.

After retiring from play due to the effects of injuries, O'Grady went to work for Yorkshire Television.  In his later years he managed a public house near Leeds.

O'Grady is the grandson of Walter Tranter, one of the earliest professional footballers in England and a member of the first team to play under the name West Ham United.

References

1942 births
Living people
Footballers from Leeds
English footballers
England international footballers
England under-23 international footballers
Association football midfielders
Huddersfield Town A.F.C. players
Leeds United F.C. players
Wolverhampton Wanderers F.C. players
Birmingham City F.C. players
Rotherham United F.C. players
League of Ireland players
English Football League players
Cork Hibernians F.C. players
English Football League representative players